The 1873 Cheshire Mid by-election was contested on 7 March 1873, due to  the resignation of the incumbent Conservative MP, George Legh. It was won by the Conservative candidate Egerton Leigh.

References

1873 elections in the United Kingdom
1873 in England
19th century in Cheshire
By-elections to the Parliament of the United Kingdom in Cheshire constituencies